Thaís Duarte Guedes (born 20 January 1993), commonly known as Thaís Guedes or Thaisinha, is a Brazilian footballer who plays as either a forward or an attacking midfielder for Santos and the Brazil national team. With Brazil's youth teams she competed at the 2008 and 2010 editions of the FIFA U-17 Women's World Cup, as well as the 2012 FIFA U-20 Women's World Cup. At senior international level she played at the 2011 FIFA Women's World Cup and the 2012 Summer Olympics tournament. A skilful forward, her playing style has been compared to that of Neymar.

Club career

In February 2013 Thaís and her Vitória das Tabocas teammate Beatriz Zaneratto João announced that they had accepted a transfer to South Korean club Incheon Hyundai Steel Red Angels.

International career

She made her debut for the senior national team in December 2010, a 3–0 2010 Torneio Internacional Cidade de São Paulo win over Mexico at Pacaembu Stadium. Thaís was named in Brazil's squad for the 2011 FIFA Women's World Cup in Germany and participated in the 3–0 group stage win over Equatorial Guinea.

Thaís was recalled to the national team after a 23-month absence in November 2015. She had returned to form with her Korean club after initially struggling to adapt and suffering several injuries.

Career statistics

International

International goals
Scores and results list Brazil's goal tally first.

References

External links
 
 Santos player profile 

1993 births
Living people
Footballers from São Paulo
Brazilian women's footballers
Women's association football forwards
Women's association football midfielders
2011 FIFA Women's World Cup players
Footballers at the 2011 Pan American Games
Olympic footballers of Brazil
Footballers at the 2012 Summer Olympics
Brazil women's international footballers
Brazilian expatriate women's footballers
Brazilian expatriate sportspeople in South Korea
Expatriate women's footballers in South Korea
Santos FC (women) players
WK League players
Incheon Hyundai Steel Red Angels WFC players
Pan American Games silver medalists for Brazil
Pan American Games medalists in football
Universiade bronze medalists for Brazil
Universiade medalists in football
Medalists at the 2011 Pan American Games
Campeonato Brasileiro de Futebol Feminino Série A1 players
Associação Acadêmica e Desportiva Vitória das Tabocas players